The Great Migration is the debut album by American rapper and record producer Bronze Nazareth. It was released on May 23, 2006, through Think Differently Music/Babygrande Records. Production was handled by Nazareth with Dreddy Kruger serving as co-producer. It features guest appearances from Wisemen, 2 on da Road, Byata, Killa Sin, Sean Price and Timbo King.

Track listing

Personnel
Justin "Bronze Nazareth" Cross – vocals, producer, co-executive producer, arranger
Timothy "Timbo King" Drayton – vocals (track 3)
Jeryl "Killa Sin" Grant – vocals (track 5)
Beatrice "Byata" Dikker – vocals (track 6)
Odion "12 O'Clock" Turner – vocals (track 9)
Sean Price – vocals (track 9)
Lamar "Prodigal Sunn" Ruff – vocals (track 9)
J. "Phillie" Wilson – vocals (tracks: 12, 15)
Kevin "Kevlaar 7" Cross – vocals (track 15)
James "Dreddy Kruger" Dockery – arranger, co-producer (tracks: 3, 5, 9), executive producer, A&R
Chris Conway – mixing
Emily Lazar – mastering
Matthew Markoff – A&R
Jill Shehebar – management
Jesse Stone – management

References

External link

2006 debut albums
Bronze Nazareth albums
Babygrande Records albums
Albums produced by Bronze Nazareth